John Macaulay may refer to:
John Macaulay (politician) (1792–1857), political figure in Upper Canada
John Simcoe Macaulay (1791–1855), another political figure in Upper Canada
John MacAulay (1895-1978), Canadian lawyer and chairman of the International Red Cross and Red Crescent Societies
John Macaulay (American football) born 1959, American football player in the NFL
John Macaulay (footballer) (fl. 1884), Scottish football player (national team)